Alex Vogel (born 30 July 1999) is a Swiss cyclist, who most recently rode for UCI Continental team .

Major results

Road
2017
 10th Road race, UEC European Junior Road Championships
2020
 5th Overall Orlen Nations Grand Prix
 5th Time trial, National Under-23 Road Championships
2021
 1st Prologue Tour du Pays de Montbéliard
 2nd Time trial, National Under-23 Road Championships
 6th Cholet-Pays de la Loire
2022
 5th Time trial, National Road Championships

Track

2017
 UEC European Junior Track Championships
2nd  Omnium
3rd  Team pursuit
2018
 National Track Championships
3rd Points race
3rd Elimination race
2019
 3rd  Team pursuit, UEC European Under-23 Track Championships
 3rd Team pursuit – Hong Kong, 2019–20 UCI World Cup
2020
 1st  Omnium, National Track Championships
 2nd  Omnium, UEC European Under-23 Track Championships
2021
 2nd  Team pursuit, UEC European Track Championships

References

External links

1999 births
Living people
Swiss male cyclists
Swiss track cyclists